The Mole People is a 1956 American science fiction adventure film distributed by Universal International, which was produced by William Alland, directed by Virgil W. Vogel, and stars John Agar, Hugh Beaumont, and Cynthia Patrick. The story is written by László Görög. The film was released on December 1, 1956, on a double feature with their jungle adventure film Curucu, Beast of the Amazon. It has also been featured on episodes of Mystery Science Theater 3000 and Svengoolie.

The film is loosely based on theories about the hollow earth. It depicts an underground civilization created by Sumerian descendants, who worship Ishtar.

Plot
A narration by Dr. Frank Baxter, an English professor at the University of Southern California, explains the premise of the film and its basis in reality. He briefly discusses the hollow earth theories of John Symmes and Cyrus Teed among others, and says that the film is a fictionalized representation of these unorthodox theories.

Archaeologists Dr. Roger Bentley and Dr. Jud Bellamin find a race of Sumerian albinos living deep under the Earth. They keep mutant humanoid mole men as their slaves to harvest mushrooms, which serve as their primary food source. The Sumerian albinos' ancestors relocated into the subterranean after cataclysmic floods in ancient Mesopotamia. They believe the men are messengers of Ishtar, their goddess. Whenever their population increases, they sacrifice young women to the Eye of Ishtar. These people have lived underground for so long that they are weakened by the light coming from the archaeologists' flashlight. However, there is one girl named Adad with natural Caucasian skin who is disdained by the others since she has the "mark of darkness."

When one of the archaeologists is killed by a mole person, Elinu, the High Priest, realizes they are not gods. He orders their capture and takes the flashlight to control the Mole People, not knowing it is depleted. The archaeologists are then sent to the Eye of Ishtar just as the Mole People rebel. Adad goes to the Eye only to realize it is really natural light coming from the surface and that the men had survived. They then climb to the surface. Unfortunately, as they are about to leave, an earthquake strikes. Adad suddenly decides to go back to her home but dies when a pillar falls on her.

Cast
 John Agar as Dr. Roger Bentley
 Cynthia Patrick as Adad
 Hugh Beaumont as Dr. Jud Bellamin
 Alan Napier as Elinu, the High Priest
 Nestor Paiva as Prof. Etienne Lafarge
 Phil Chambers as Dr. Paul Stuart
 Rodd Redwing as Nazar
 Robin Hughes as First Officer
 Frank Baxter as himself

Home media
Universal first released The Mole People on VHS on June 30, 1993. Later, in 2006, the film was released on DVD in a boxed set called The Classic Sci-Fi Ultimate Collection, which featured 4 other films (Tarantula, The Incredible Shrinking Man, The Monolith Monsters, and Monster on the Campus). Universal then re-released this film in 2015 as a stand-alone DVD as part of its Universal Vault Series. Shout Factory's 2019 Blu-ray release includes an audio commentary by Tom Weaver, David Schecter and Jan Alan Henderson, plus other extras. There is also a Region 2 DVD and bluray release of this film from 101 Films.

In other media

The film was featured on the television program Mystery Science Theater 3000. The characters respond to the abrupt and unsatisfying ending by bitterly declaring "And no one trusted a John Agar movie again."; the ending was changed from a typical happily-ever-after scenario because members of the studio felt that Bentley's romance with Adad would promote interracial relationships. 

A segment of the film was used for  1968's The Wild World of Batwoman, as creatures created by one of the film's villains. This use was itself parodied by Mystery Science Theater 3000, with Crow T. Robot and Tom Servo mocking the classic slogan for Reese's Peanut Butter cups followed by Mike Nelson imitating the film's villain, proclaiming "That's enough of THAT film."

Mythology

The fictionalized Mesopotamian history presented by the movie is based largely on Panbabylonism, as both Sumerian and Judaic stories describe the same events of the movie. Dr. Bentley states, erroneously, that the Biblical flood is an established archaeological fact, and the stranding of the Sumerians atop the mountain is a reference to the tale of Noah's Ark.

Similarly to the protagonists of the movie Ishtar descends to the underworld. There is a Panbabylonic connection between Ishtar's descent and the Old Testament story of Joseph. The descent to the underworld is a common story of world mythologies, as is the flood myth.

The movie erroneously associates Ishtar and the Sumerians. Ishtar was the Babylonian counterpart of the Sumerian goddess Inanna. The imagery associated with Ishtar in the movie is entirely fictional: Ishtar's symbol was an eight-pointed star representing Venus rather than the uneven chevron in the movie. All of the gods depicted on the temple walls are Egyptian, not Sumerian.

Adad is an Akkadian (male) storm-god, counterpart to the Sumerian Ishkur.

See also
Mole Man (1961), character from the Marvel Universe

References

External links

 
 
 
 MST3K Episode Guide: The Mole People
 DVD Review of The Mole People 
 Rerecording of The Mole People soundtrack

1950s science fiction horror films
1956 directorial debut films
1956 films
American black-and-white films
American science fiction horror films
Films about the Hollow Earth
Inanna
Lost world films
Mesopotamian mythology in popular culture
Universal Pictures films
Sumer in fiction
1950s English-language films
Films directed by Virgil W. Vogel
1950s American films